Alexandra Grauvogl  (born 16 November 1981) is a German freestyle skier.

She won a bronze medal in ski cross at the FIS Freestyle World Ski Championships 2007. She also competed at the 2005 and 2009 world championships.

References

External links 
 

1981 births
Living people
People from Miesbach (district)
Sportspeople from Upper Bavaria
German female freestyle skiers
Universiade bronze medalists for Germany
Universiade medalists in freestyle skiing
Competitors at the 2005 Winter Universiade
21st-century German women